Sébastien Michalowski (born 12 March 1978) is a retired French football defender. He was previously plays in CM Aubervilliers, Lille OSC, Montpellier HSC and FC Sète. He was born in Le Blanc-Mesnil.

External links 
 
 

1978 births
People from Le Blanc-Mesnil
Lille OSC players
French footballers
Living people
Ligue 1 players
Ligue 2 players
Montpellier HSC players
FC Sète 34 players
FCM Aubervilliers players
Association football midfielders
Footballers from Seine-Saint-Denis